Henry Drayton (fl. 1410s - 1430s) was a Canon of Windsor from 1411 to 1413.

Career

He was appointed:
Vicar of West Drayton
Rector of Hilgay, Norfolk
Custos of the Free Chapel of St Radegund in St Paul’s Cathedral 1407
Rector of St Giles-without-Cripplegate 1407
Rector of St Pancras Old Church 1434

He was appointed to the fourth stall in St George's Chapel, Windsor Castle in 1411, and held the stall until 1413.

Notes 

Canons of Windsor